Chip Conley (born October 31, 1960) is an American hotelier, hospitality entrepreneur, author, and speaker.

Early life and education
Conley was born in Orange, California and graduated from the PACE program at Long Beach Polytechnic High School. He received his BA in 1982 and an MBA in 1984 from Stanford University. He received an honorary doctorate from Saybrook University.

In 1987, Conley founded Joie de Vivre Hospitality, where he held the position of CEO for nearly 24 years, creating and managing around 50 boutique hotels. In 2010, he sold his company to Geolo Capital. The last hotel concept he created for the company was The Epiphany in Palo Alto. Conley remains a private owner in many hotel properties and no longer has an operating role in the company.

Conley spoke at the annual TED conference in 2010 on creating a business model driven by our need for meaning as outlined by Abraham Maslow's hierarchy of needs and as presented in his book Peak: How Great Companies Get their Mojo from Maslow. Conley's other books include The Rebel Rules: Daring to Be Yourself in Business; Marketing that Matters: 10 Practices to Profit Your Business and Change the World; Emotional Equations: Simple Truths for Creating Happiness + Success in Business + in Life; Wisdom@Work: The Making of a Modern Elder.

In 2013, Conley became Head of Global Hospitality and Strategy for Airbnb. and founded Fest300. At Airbnb, he was asked by the three co-founders to help evolve the company into a hospitality company with more than one million hosts in 191 countries. Conley worked closely with CEO Brian Chesky as a mentor and helped to build a bridge to the travel, hotel, and real estate/development/landlord industries. He also conceived and led the annual Airbnb Open. In 2017, he transitioned to the role of Strategic Advisor for Hospitality and Leadership.

In 2016, Fest300 was acquired by Everfest, with Conley joining the Everfest leadership team as Chief Strategy Officer on a part-time basis. 

In 2018, he founded the Modern Elder Academy (MEA), the world's first "midlife wisdom school" in Baja California Sur. This  oceanfront campus is dedicated to helping students reimagine midlife as a time for learning, growth, and positive transformation through immersive workshops, sabbaticals, and digital programs. Modern Elder Academy focuses on Long Life Learning, and is a mission-driven organization committed to socio-economic diversity, having provided scholarships to 50% of their 2,000 alumni. Graduates receive a certificate in Mindset Management.

In 2021, Modern Elder Academy acquired Saddleback Ranch in Northern New Mexico and set out to grow a collection of MEA Regenerative Communities. Each community will include a MEA wisdom school, residences and a regenerative farm.

Community activism
Conley founded San Francisco's annual Celebrity Pool Toss fundraiser, which has raised millions for inner city families in San Francisco's Tenderloin District, where Conley's first hotel, the Phoenix, is located. He also created the annual Hotel Hero Awards that recognize the work of line-level hospitality staff. He served on the Glide Memorial Board for nearly a decade, as well as the boards for the Burning Man Project and the Esalen Institute. He now serves on the board of Encore.org and the advisory board for the Stanford Center for Longevity.

Awards
 Northern California Real Estate Entrepreneur of the Year
 Bay Area's Most Innovative CEO
 ISHC Pioneer Award
 GLIDE Cecil Williams Legacy Award

Books
 The Rebel Rules: Daring to be Yourself in Business; Simon & Schuster, 2001
 Marketing that Matters: 10 Practices to Profit Your Business and Change the World; co-authored with Eric Friedenwald-Fishman, Berrett-Koehler Publishers, 2006
 Peak: How Great Companies Get Their Mojo From Maslow; Jossey-Bass, 2007
 Emotional Equations: Simple Truths for Creating Happiness + Success in Business + Life; Simon & Schuster, 2012
 Wisdom@Work: The Making of a Modern Elder; Currency, 2018

References

External links
 ChipConley.com

1960 births
American hoteliers
Living people
Stanford Graduate School of Business alumni
Long Beach Polytechnic High School alumni